Cents-Hamm railway station is a railway station serving the quarters of Cents and Hamm in the east of Luxembourg City, in southern Luxembourg.  It is operated by Chemins de Fer Luxembourgeois, the state-owned railway company.

The station is situated on Line 30, which connects Luxembourg City to the east of the country and Trier.  It is the first stop east out of Luxembourg station, which is located on the other side of the Alzette valley.

External links
 Official CFL page on Cents-Hamm station
 Rail.lu page on Cents-Hamm station

Railway stations in Luxembourg City
Railway stations on CFL Line 30